Joseph Adrien Lévesque (September 16, 1923 – March 5, 1995) was a Canadian politician. He served in the Legislative Assembly of New Brunswick from 1960 to 1970 as member of the Liberal party.

References

1923 births
1995 deaths